Pagpag is the Tagalog term for leftover food from restaurants (usually from fast food restaurants) scavenged from garbage sites and dumps. Pagpag food can also be expired frozen meat, fish, or vegetables discarded by supermarkets and scavenged in garbage trucks where this expired food is collected. The word in the Tagalog language literally means "to shake off the dust or dirt", and refers to the act of shaking the dirt off of the edible portion of the leftovers. Pagpag can be eaten immediately after it is found or can be cooked in variety of ways.

The act of eating pagpag arose from the challenges of hunger that resulted from extreme poverty in the Philippines. Selling pagpag was a profitable business in areas where poor people live. Pagpag is also called batchoy, which is derived from the Filipino dish with the same name.  Technically, batchoy is soup-based though the term batchoy that is used to refer to leftover food from trash may be a meal cooked differently like fried pagpag batchoy.  People who scavenge leftover food from garbage are called mambabatchoy.

Preparation
After dirt and inedible substances are removed then pagpag can be eaten on site where it is found. It can also be processed further, most commonly by frying it in hot oil depending on the kind of food. Filipino politician and actor Isko Moreno used to scavenge leftover food and calling it pagpag batsoy after frying it. Small cottage industries have arisen around pagpag with impoverished people making a living scavenging, collecting, processing, and selling the processed pagpag to other financially challenged people. A cook in a restaurant in Tondo, Manila prepares pagpag in traditional Filipino cooking, such as pagpag à la kaldereta or adobo, with the mixture of the leftover chicken from Jollibee and KFC as the main ingredient.

Health concerns

Health risks include ingestion of poisons, toxins, and food-borne illnesses. The National Anti-Poverty Commission warns against eating pagpag because of the threat of malnutrition and diseases such as Hepatitis A, typhoid, diarrhea, and cholera.

Solutions on stopping the spread of pagpag food

Hunger has been linked to the spread of pagpag food and the food crisis in 2008 was said to be the cause in the rise of poverty in the Philippines. The National Statistical Coordination Board recommended the administration of Philippine President Benigno Aquino III to reduce poverty. Department of Social Welfare and Development Secretary Dinky Soliman said that the government has been addressing the issue and helping the poor through feeding programs and conditional cash transfers. In 2014, a survey conducted by the Social Weather Stations revealed that incidence of hunger in the Philippines was reduced but the Trade Union Congress of the Philippines-Nagkaisa attributed the decrease of hunger to the rapid spreading of pagpag.

Zero waste management is seen as a viable solution in stopping the proliferation of pagpag food.

Media coverage

Extreme hunger in the Philippines that features pagpag has been covered in various television documentaries. In 2003, the episode entitled "Basurero" (garbage collector) of the documentary show I-Witness of GMA Network tells a story of poor people collecting leftovers from the trash of fast food restaurants. In the said episode, those people who scavenged for food in trash are called magbabatchoy, which was derived from the word batchoy, a popular Filipino dish. As shown in ABS-CBN in 2006, Probe, another documentary show, features pagpag and mentions health risks of eating pagpag.

After CNN reported about pagpag in 2012, the reality about problems of hunger in the Philippines was brought to the world's attention. The San Diego Tribune also featured an article about residents of Payatas preparing pagpag in celebration of Pope Francis's visit to the Philippines. In February 2018, BBC News published a 3-minute long mini-documentary showing how pagpag is made, whereby the team followed a bag of meat from the rubbish dump to the dinner table.

Other uses of the word

In common use, pagpag means the act of shaking off dust or dirt. Pagpag is also a Filipino term for a superstition saying one can never go directly to one's home after attending a funeral unless they have done the pagpag. This practice is observed to avoid the following of the dead's soul to the home of the visitor of the wake.

References 

Malnutrition
Poverty in the Philippines
Tagalog words and phrases
Food and the environment
Meals
Philippine cuisine